Stamford High School is an independent school for girls in Stamford, Lincolnshire, England, situated on High Street, St Martin's. From September 2023, Stamford Endowed Schools (SES) will become co-educational.

Education
Stamford High School provides education for students aged 11 (year 7) to 18 (year 13). Sixth form teaching is carried out jointly with Stamford School as of 2000. Currently there are 642 students (588 day, 54 boarding) attending the school. The school belongs to the Stamford Endowed Schools, a member of the Headmasters' and Headmistresses' Conference.

History
The school was founded in 1877 and stands at its original site on the south side of the River Welland. The partner school, Stamford School was founded in 1532.

The funds for the foundation of the High School and the further endowment of the existing boys' school were appropriated from the endowment of Browne's Hospital by Act of Parliament in 1871. This trust had originally been established for the relief of poverty by William Browne (died 1489), a wealthy wool merchant and alderman of the town.

In recent years, the two schools have been united under the leadership of a single principal as the Stamford Endowed Schools. This organisation now comprises Stamford Junior School, a co-educational establishment for pupils aged between 2 and 11 years and Stamford School and Stamford High School for students aged 11–18. Sixth form teaching is carried out jointly between Stamford School and Stamford High School.

Stamford Endowed Schools will become co-educational from September 2023 and will be fully co-educational in every year group from September 2024.

School traditions
There is a house system for all students with houses named after famous heroines - Cavell, Beale, Anderson and Eliot.

Notable former pupils

 Izzy Bizu, singer-songwriter
 Sarah Cawood
 Paule Constable, stage lighting designer
 Rae Earl
 Anita Ganeri, children's author
 Daphne Ledward, Gardeners' Question Time panellist
 Claire Lomas
 Sarah Outen, first woman to row solo across the Indian Ocean

References

External links
 Official website
 Profile on MyDaughter
 Profile on the ISC website
 ISI Inspection Reports

Educational institutions established in 1877
Private schools in Lincolnshire
Girls' schools in Lincolnshire
Buildings and structures in Stamford, Lincolnshire
Education in Stamford, Lincolnshire
Boarding schools in Lincolnshire
1877 establishments in England
Member schools of the Girls' Schools Association

Diamond schools